The following is a timeline of the history of the city of New Orleans, Louisiana, USA.

18th century

 1718 – La Nouvelle-Orléans founded by Jean-Baptiste Le Moyne de Bienville of the Mississippi Company.
 1722 – Capital of La Louisiane is relocated to New Orleans, from Biloxi.
 1724 - Code Noir implemented in Congo Square gave enslaved Africans Sundays off "to dance".
 1734 – Ursuline Convent built.
 1752 – Modern-day Ursuline Convent building is finished, today the oldest and finest French Colonial building in the U.S.
 1762 – French colony ceded to Spain under Alejandro O'Reilly.
 1768 - Population: 3.200. (approx).
 1769 - New Orleans City Archives established.
 1770s – Lafitte's Blacksmith Shop was built, one of the oldest extant buildings in New Orleans.
 1779–1781 – Governor-general Bernardo de Gálvez successfully wages the Gulf Coast campaign against British West Florida, as part of the Anglo-Spanish War (1779–83) and in support of the American Revolutionary War.
 1788
 Great New Orleans Fire.
 Lafayette Square laid out (approximate date), by the Surveyor-general Charles Trudeau, who would later serve as interim mayor.
 Madame John's Legacy was built, today a rare example of a raised cottage in the French Quarter.
 1789 – Saint Louis Cemetery established.
 1792 – Theatre de la Rue Saint Pierre opened.
 1794
 2nd Great New Orleans Fire
 St. Louis Cathedral built on the site of an earlier Catholic church.
 Carondelet Canal constructed.
 1799 – Cabildo (seat of Spanish colonial city hall ) rebuilding completed.

19th century

1800s–1840s
 1801 – France regains power, on paper.
 1803
 Napoleon sells a huge swath of North America to the U.S. via the Louisiana Purchase. Formalities of the Spanish transfer to France and the French cession to the United States do not take place until November and December, at the Cabildo; with Upper Louisiana (St. Louis)'s ceremony occurring in the spring of 1804.
 Etienne de Boré becomes the first mayor, under territorial Governor William C. C. Claiborne.
 Population: 10,000. (approx).
 1804
Orleans Gazette newspaper begins publication.
 The Territory of Orleans (future state of Louisiana) is established, with the seat of government in New Orleans.
 1805 – New Orleans incorporated as a city
 1806 – New Orleans Mechanics Society instituted.
 1810 – Population: 17,242.
 1811 – Largest slave revolt in American history occurs nearby, with Orleans Parish involved in its aftermath.
 1812
April – Louisiana becomes a state, with New Orleans as its first capital.
August – 1812 Louisiana hurricane
 1813 – The Presbytere built.
 1815
 January – Battle of New Orleans
 Charity Hospital built.
 Théâtre d'Orléans opens.
 1816 – First licensed pharmacist in the United States, Louis J. Dufilho, Jr.
 1817 – First Congregational Church built.
 1818 – Fort Pike built.
 1822 – Fort Macomb built.
 1824
 American Theatre built.
 Pontchartrain Hotel built at Spanish Fort.
 Camp Street Theatre becomes the first English language theater constructed in New Orleans. 
 1827
 L’Abeille de la Nouvelle-Orléans newspaper begins publication.
 Algiers ferry in operation, which has run continuously to the present day.
 1830 – Introduction of natural gas
 1831 – Pontchartrain Railroad begins operating.
 1832 – First steam-powered cotton press
 1833 – Lafayette Cemetery is founded.
 1834 – Medical College of Louisiana and U.S. Mint established.
 1835
 New Orleans and Carrollton Railroad begins operating, which became today's streetcar lines.
 U.S. military barracks and First Presbyterian Church built.
 St. Charles Theatre in operation.
 Convent of the Holy Family founded.
 1836
 City is divided into three municipalities, which system existed for about twenty years.
 St. Louis Hotel in business.
 Female Orphan Asylum in operation.
 1837
 The Picayune newspaper begins publication.
 U.S. economic recession begins with the Panic of 1837.
 Christ Church built.
 1838
 St. Charles Hotel in business.
 New Basin Canal opens, connecting uptown and the lakefront.
 St. Vincent De Paul Church built.
 1840
 Population reaches approximately 102,000 or double the 1830 population. At this point, New Orleans is the wealthiest city in the nation, the third-most populous city, and the largest city in the South. (New York City's population was 312,000. Baltimore and New Orleans were the same size, with Baltimore showing only 100 more people.)
 Beginning of the city's public school system
25th anniversary celebration of the Battle of New Orleans victory, with former President Andrew Jackson in attendance
 Antoine's restaurant in business.
 St. Patrick's Church built.
 Cypress Grove Cemetery and First German Lutheran Congregation established.
 1841
 The Boston Club formed.
 St. Augustine Church founded.
 1842
 St. Augustine Church dedicated.
 Holy Family Sisters founded.
 1844
 824 Canal Street built by James Gallier for Dr William Newton Mercer, a planter from Mississippi who served as a surgeon in the War of 1812.
 1845 – City Hall built.
 1846
 Public School Library, 1st District, established.
 Jackson monument erected.
 De Bow's Commercial Review begins publication.
 1847 – University of Louisiana Law School opens.
 1849
 State capital is relocated to the then-small-town of Baton Rouge.
 Flood.

1850s–1890s
 1850's - St. Louis Cathedral rebuilding completed.
 1852
 Lafayette becomes part of city.
 Union Race Course opens.
 Touro Infirmary founded.

 1853
 City Park established.
 Major yellow fever epidemic.
 1855 – Swiss Benevolent Society founded.
 1856
 Mistick Krewe of Comus founded.
 Last Island hurricane dumps 13 inches of rainfall on the city.
 Texas and New Orleans Railroad founded.
 1857
 Saint Alphonsus Church built.
 The Pickwick Club formed.
 1859
 French Opera House opens.
 Locust Grove Cemetery established.
 1860
 Louisiana Historical Society incorporated.
 St. Mary's Assumption Church built.
 Population: 168,675.
 1861 – January – Louisiana votes to secede from the Union.
 1862
 Capture of New Orleans by Union forces.
 Café du Monde in business.
 Harmony Club formed.
 1863 – New-Orleans Times newspaper begins publication.
 1866 – New Orleans riot
 1867 – Another in the long series of yellow fever epidemics; this one took its toll in Texas, as well.
 1868
 Louisiana readmitted to the Union.
 Straight University founded.
 1869 – New Orleans University founded.
 1870
 Algiers and Jefferson City annexed.
 Leland College established.
 Population: 191,418.
 1871
 New Orleans Cotton Exchange established.
 Audubon Park established.
 1874
 Carrollton annexed. 
 Battle of Liberty Place, white insurrection against the Reconstruction government.
 1876
 St. Roch Cemetery chapel dedicated.
 New Orleans Lawn Tennis Club and Athénée Louisianais founded.
 1879 – Unsightly beggar ordinance effected.
 1880 – Population: 216,090.
 1881 – Southern University opens.
 1882 - Flood.
 1883 – Theatre built at Spanish Fort.
 1884 – World Cotton Centennial held.
 1886
 Christ Church Cathedral founded.
 New Orleans Camera Club organized.
 1887 – Howard Memorial Library built.
 1889 – Louisiana Historical Association founded.
 1890
Confederate Memorial Hall built. Commander's Palace restaurant opens.
Jefferson City Buzzards Mardi Gras Marching Club formed and will live to become the oldest marching club.
 Population: 242,039.
 1891
 Jackson Brewery building constructed.
 Liberty Monument erected.
 Italian troubles of 1891.
 1892
 New Orleans Union Station opens.
 Street Railway Union established.
 June – Homer Plessy arrested.
 1892 New Orleans general strike.

 1893  
 Electric streetcars begin operating. 
 The Roosevelt New Orleans Hotel opens as Hotel Grunewald.
 1894 – U.S. Naval Station built.
 1895 – 1895 New Orleans dockworkers riot
 1895 – Hennen Building completed.
 1896 – Fisk Free and Public Library opens.
 1897 – Storyville district established.
 1898 - City Board of Health created.
 1900
 Robert Charles Riots
 Art Association of New Orleans founded.
 Development of Garden District concluded.
Population: 287,104.

20th century

1900s–1940s
 1901 – Louisiana hurricane causes much flooding in the city, due partly to the overflowing Carondelet Canal.
 1904 – Loyola College established.
 1905 – Galatoire's restaurant in business.
 1906
 Louisiana State Museum founded.
 Beth Israel synagogue opens.
 1907
 Dixie Brewing Company in business.
 New Orleans Library Club formed.
 White City amusement park in business.
 1908 – New Orleans Public Library main branch building opens.
 1909 – The Grand Isle hurricane causes much New Orleans flooding.
 1910 – Population: 339,075.
 1911 – Delgado Museum of Art and Young Women's Christian Association (YWCA) of New Orleans established.
 1914 – Audubon Zoo established.
 1915
 Xavier College established.
 1915 New Orleans hurricane inflicts great wind damage, destroying churches and the Presbytere's cupola.
 1916 – Our Lady of Holy Cross College and Zulu Social Aid & Pleasure Club established.
 1917
 Livery Stable Blues recorded by the Original Dixieland Jass Band.
 Storyville closed.
 1918
 1918 influenza epidemic.
 Arnaud's restaurant in business.
 1919 – The French Opera House is destroyed by fire
 1920
 Broussard's restaurant in business.
 Population: 387,219.
 1921
 Delgado Central Trades School opens.
 Orpheum Theater in operation.
 Hibernia Bank Building constructed.
 1922 - WWL radio begins broadcasting.
 1923
 WDSU radio begins broadcasting.
 Notre Dame Seminary founded.
 Roosevelt Hotel in business.
 Industrial Canal Lock built.
 1924
 New Orleans Item-Tribune newspaper begins publication.
 Women's "Petit Salon" organized.
 1925
 WSMB radio begins broadcasting.
 Lakeview Presbyterian Church built.
 1926
 WBNO and WJBW radio begin broadcasting.
 State Palace Theatre built.
 Tulane Stadium opens.
 1927
 Saenger Theatre opens.
 First National Bank of Commerce Building constructed.
 Pontchartrain Hotel in business.
 1928 – Pontchartrain Beach amusement park opens.
 1929 – National American Bank Building constructed.
 1930
 Dillard University chartered.
 Municipal Auditorium opens.
 Broadmoor Improvement Association formed.
 Population: 458,762.
 1932 – Bureau of Governmental Research established.
 1933 – O'Brien's in business.
 1935 – Sugar Bowl begins.
 1936 – New Orleans Botanical Garden opens.
 1937 – New Orleans Roosevelt Review begins publication.
 1938
 Zurich Classic of New Orleans golf tournament begins.
 Vieux Carré Property Owners, Residents, and Associates preservation group incorporated.
 1939
 Charity Hospital built.
 Lincoln Beach amusement park in business.
 1943 - New Orleans Opera Association formed.
 1946
 Moisant International Airport opens.
 Foreign trade zone established in the Port of New Orleans.
 New Orleans Baptist Theological Seminary formed.
 1947
 Joy Theater opens.
 New Orleans Emergency Medical Services established.
 September hurricane creates tremendous flooding, shutting down Moisant Airport.
 1948 - WDSU-TV (television) begins broadcasting.
 1949 – Middle South Utilities in business.

1950s–1990s
 1950 – New Orleans Pharmacy Museum opens.
 1951 - St. Augustine High School opens to educate African-American young men preparing for college.
 1953 - WJMR-TV (television) begins broadcasting.
 1954
 McDonogh Day Boycott
 New Orleans Union Passenger Terminal opens.
 1956
 Louisiana State University in New Orleans and Southern University at New Orleans established.
 Lake Pontchartrain Causeway opens.
 1957
 Pontchartrain Expressway opens.
 Harvey Tunnel built.
 1958 – Greater New Orleans Bridge opens.
 1959 - WVUE-TV (television) begins broadcasting.
 1960 – November: Desegregation of New Orleans Public Schools begins, with Ruby Bridges attending William Frantz Elementary.
 1965
 Annual Marathon race begins.
 I-10 Twin Span Bridge opens.
 Hurricane Betsy causes great damage to the city, the worst before Katrina 40 years later.
 1966 – Historic New Orleans Collection and Amistad Research Center established.
 1967
 New Orleans Saints football team formed.
 International Trade Mart building constructed.
 1969
Plaza Tower built.
Hurricane Camille inflicts $320 million damage in Louisiana.
 1970 –  Jazz Fest begins.
 1972 – One Shell Square built.
 1973 
 UpStairs Lounge arson attack
 Sniper Mark Essex attacks police in a shooting spree at a Howard Johnsons hotel. 
 New Orleans Center for Creative Arts opened.
 1974
 New Orleans Jazz basketball team formed.
 Preservation Resource Center founded.
 1975 
 Superdome opens.
 WYLD-FM begins airing in an R&B format.
 1978
 Ernest N. Morial is elected as city's first African-American mayor. 
 New Orleans Academy of Fine Arts established.
 1979
 K-Paul's Louisiana Kitchen in business.
 Annual Crescent City Classic running race begins.
 New Orleans Regional Transit Authority established.
 New Orleans Jazz basketball team relocates to Utah and becomes the Utah Jazz.
 1980 
 Longue Vue House and Gardens opens.
 Radio WWOZ begins broadcasting.
 1981 – New Orleans Mint museum active.
 1983
 Lakefront Arena opens.
 Luling Bridge opens.
 Pontchartrain Beach amusement park closes.
 1984
 French Quarter Festival begins.
 Convention Center opens.
 1984 Louisiana World Exposition
 Place St. Charles built.
 1986 – Tennessee Williams/New Orleans Literary Festival begins. Ends a few months later
 1988 – 1988 Republican National Convention
 1989 – New Orleans Film Society founded.
 1990
 Emeril’s restaurant in business.
 Aquarium of the Americas opens.
 Bayou Sauvage National Wildlife Refuge established.
 Population: 496,938.
 1991 – Louisiana Philharmonic Orchestra formed.
 1994 –  New Orleans Jazz National Historical Park created.
 1995
 Essence Music Festival begins.
 May 1995 Louisiana flood
 1998 – City website online (approximate date).
 1999 – Voodoo Fest of music begins.
 2000
 National World War II Museum opens.
 Six Flags New Orleans theme park opened (closed 2005); initially called Jazzland.
 Population: 484,674.

21st century

2000s
 2001 – New Orleans Bowl begins.
 2002
 Charlotte Hornets basketball team relocates to New Orleans and becomes the New Orleans Hornets.
 New Orleans VooDoo football team formed.
 2003
 Iron Rail Book Collective founded.
 Ogden Museum of Southern Art established.
 John McDonogh High School shooting
 2004 – Christmas Eve snowstorm
 2005
 August – Hurricane Katrina; levee failures.
 September – Hurricane Rita.
 Bring New Orleans Back Commission formed.
 Big Easy Rollergirls established.
 2006
 World Cultural Economic Forum begins.
 January – Chocolate City speech.
 2008
 Hurricane Gustav
 Prospect New Orleans art exhibit begins.
 Audubon Insectarium opens.
 2009 – Joseph Cao  becomes U.S. Representative for Louisiana's 2nd congressional district, Congress's first Vietnamese American member.

2010s
 2010 
 Population: 343,829. The New Orleans Saints win Super Bowl XLIV on February 7, 2010, bringing home the city's first ever major professional league sports title. 
 Mitch Landrieu elected mayor
 Treme (TV series) debuts
 Deepwater Horizon oil disaster
 2011 - Cedric Richmond becomes U.S. representative for Louisiana's 2nd congressional district.
 2012
BlightStatus city app launched.
Hurricane Isaac creates widespread power outages.
 2013
New Orleans Hornets basketball team renames themselves the New Orleans Pelicans in an effort to localize its name and identity.
 2014
 Former mayor Nagin sentenced to prison.
 Fictional program NCIS New Orleans debuts premiere episode on WWL, part of the wider NCIS franchise set in the city
 2015
 200th anniversary commemoration of the Battle of New Orleans.
 Population: 386,617 (estimate).
 2016
Population: 387,200
 2017
 August-Solar Eclipse during August 21, 2017  
 Population: 389,157
 Removal of Robert E. Lee Statue and other prominent monuments to the Confederacy
 2018
 Population: 392,120
 LaToya Cantrell elected mayor
 2019
 Population: 395,429 (estimation)
 A new Hard Rock Hotel and Casino being constructed in the city partially collapses, causing a large search effort.

2020s
 2021
Hurricane Ida makes landfall in Louisiana, passing through New Orleans on the 16th anniversary of Hurricane Katrina.
2025
 Population :421,987 (estimate)

See also
 History of New Orleans
 List of mayors of New Orleans
 List of National Historic Landmarks in Louisiana
 National Register of Historic Places listings in Orleans Parish, Louisiana
 Timeline of Louisiana
 Other cities in Louisiana:
 Timeline of Baton Rouge, Louisiana
 Timeline of Shreveport, Louisiana

References

Bibliography

Published in 19th century
 
 
 
 
 
 
  1871 ed.
 
 
 
 
 
 1878
 1883

Published in 20th century
 
 
 
 
 
 
 1913
 
 
 
 
 Albert A. Fossier. New Orleans, the Glamour Period, 1800-1840. New Orleans, La.: Pelican, 1957. 
 
 Robert Reinders and John Duffy. End of an Era: New Orleans, 1850-1860. New Orleans, La.: Pelican, 1964. 
 
 
 Walter G. Cowan et al. New Orleans Yesterday and Today: A Guide to the City. Baton Rouge: Louisiana State University Press, 1983. 
 Arnold R. Hirsch and Joseph Logsdon, eds. Creole New Orleans: Race and Americanization. Baton Rouge: Louisiana State University Press, 1992.

Published in 21st century
 
  (Baltimore, Detroit, Los Angeles, New Orleans)
 
 
 Richard Campanella (2006). Geographies of New Orleans: Urban Fabrics Before the Storm. Lafayette: University of Louisiana, Center for Louisiana Studies
 
 
 Michael E. Crutcher, Jr. Tremé: Race and Place in a New Orleans Neighborhood (Athens, GA: University of Georgia Press, 2010)
 Lake Douglas. Public Spaces, Private Gardens: A History of Designed Landscapes in New Orleans (Baton Rouge: Louisiana State University Press, 2011)

External links

 
 Louisiana Historical Society. Resources for Research in New Orleans
 , ca.1722-1956
  (about New Orleans Police Department)
  Louisiana Association of Museums. List of Louisiana Museums, 2013
 
 Digital Public Library of America. Works related to New Orleans, various dates
 Europeana. Items related to New Orleans, various dates.

New Orleans
New Orleans
Years in Louisiana
New Orleans-related lists